Boston Flour Mill is a historic gristmill in Shedd, Oregon.

It was built in 1863 and added to the National Register of Historic Places in 1979. It is part of the Thompson's Mills State Heritage Site.

The mill has been the site of field schools of both the historic preservation program and the archaeology program of the University of Oregon, in 2003 and 2005 respectively.

References

External links
The Boston Mill Society
Historic images of Boston Mill from Salem Public Library
Historic American Engineering Record (HAER) documentation, filed under Shedd, Linn County, OR:

Buildings and structures in Linn County, Oregon
Historic American Engineering Record in Oregon
National Register of Historic Places in Linn County, Oregon
Queen Anne architecture in Oregon
Industrial buildings completed in 1863
Industrial buildings and structures on the National Register of Historic Places in Oregon
1863 establishments in Oregon